Rene Ben Sussan (born 1895 in Salonika) was an illustrator, active from the 1920s to the 1960s. His most widely seen works are his illustrations for the various "Limited Editions Club" and "Heritage Press" series of small print runs of handmade and hand-bound books.

He illustrated:

Volpone, or The Fox, by Ben Jonson, 1952 

Eugénie Grandet by Honoré de Balzac, translated from the French by Ellen Marriage with an introduction by Richard Aldington, London 1960

The Cid, translated by Robert Southey, 1958 

The Merchant of Venice by William Shakespeare, Limited Editions Club, 1939 

Sheridan's Plays by Richard Brinsley Sheridan, Heritage Press, 1956 

The Rivals by Richard Brinsley Sheridan, Limited Editions Club, 1953. Etchings hand-colored.

The School for Scandal by Richard Brinsley Sheridan, Limited Editions Club 1934. Etchings hand-illustrated.

Old Goriot by Honoré de Balzac, Limited Editions Club, 1948. 1st thus illustrated by Rene Ben Sussan. 4to, hand-colored illustrations 

Les Soeurs Hortensias par Henri Duvernois, Le Livre de Demain, Arthème Fayard, Paris, 1941, 31 bois originaux.

References

Greek illustrators
1895 births
Year of death missing
Artists from Thessaloniki